Sara Agnes Rice Pryor, born Sara Agnes Rice (February 19, 1830 – February 15, 1912), was an American writer and community activist in New York City.  Born and reared in Virginia, she moved North after the American Civil War with her husband and family to rebuild their life.  He was a former politician and Confederate general; together they became influential in New York society, which included numerous "Confederate carpetbaggers" after the war. After settling in New York, she and her husband both later renounced the Confederacy.

Pryor was among founders of a home for women and children in Brooklyn, New York. She helped found heritage organizations, including Preservation of the Virginia Antiquities, the Daughters of the American Revolution, the Mary Washington Memorial Association, and the National Society of the Colonial Dames of America.  She was active in fundraising to support their goals. She was noted as a central figure in fundraising for a yellow fever outbreak to benefit children in Jacksonville, Florida.

In the early 1900s, Pryor published two histories, two memoirs of the Civil War years, and novels with the Macmillan Company. Her first memoir was recommended by the United Daughters of the Confederacy, which encouraged southern women writers to defend the southern cause. Her memoirs have been sources for historians on the life of her society during and after the war years.

Early life, lineage and education
Sara Agnes Rice was born in Halifax County, Virginia to Samuel Blair Rice, a Baptist preacher, and his second wife, Lucinda Walton Leftwich (1807–1855); they had more than 10 children together.  At about the age of three, Sara was effectively adopted by her childless aunt, Mary Blair Hargrave, and her husband, Dr. Samuel Pleasants Hargrave, and lived mostly with this couple in Hanover, Virginia.  The aunt and uncle were slaveholders. When Sara was about eight, the Hargraves moved to Charlottesville to seek a better education for her.

On her father's side, Sara was a granddaughter of William Rice of "Greenwood", Charlotte County, Virginia, and his wife Mary Bacon Crenshaw. She was a great-granddaughter of David Rice, a Presbyterian minister in Kentucky, and his wife Mary Blair. Sara named one of her daughters "Mary Blair" in keeping with her grandfather William's wish to honor the original Mary Blair, his mother. David Rice acted as clergyman and orator to the Hanover militia in 1775. He was a member of the 1792 convention that framed the first constitution of the State of Kentucky.

On her mother's side, she was a granddaughter of Rev. William Leftwich and Frances Otey, and a great-granddaughter of Col. John Otey, of Bedford, Virginia, and his wife Mary Hopkins. Col. John Otey served as colonel and captain of a battalion of riflemen. Also descendant of Col. William Leftwich, Samuel Blair, and Maj. Gen. Joel Leftwich.

Marriage and family
On November 8, 1848, Sara Agnes Rice married Roger Atkinson Pryor, of a Virginia Tidewater family. A journalist, he became a politician. He was elected to both the US Congress and the Confederate Congress after Virginia's secession.  Although they did not own slaves, each had grown up in slaveholding families. He supported the institution with fiery speeches prior to the Civil War. He later publicly expressed his regret for his support of the Confederacy.

Sara and Roger A. Pryor had seven children together, the last born after the war.  
Maria Gordon Pryor (called Gordon) (1850–1928); married her cousin Henry Crenshaw Rice (1842–1916). Their daughter Mary Blair published several books under the pen name Blair Niles.
Theodorick Bland Pryor (1851–1871), died at age 20, likely a suicide, as he had been suffering from depression. Admitted to Princeton College at a young age, he was its first mathematical fellow; he also studied at Cambridge, and had been studying law. He was buried in Princeton Cemetery.
Roger Atkinson Pryor; became a lawyer in New York.
Mary Blair Pryor; married Francis Thomas Walker,  she had daughter Mary Blair Walker Zimmer. Buried in Princeton Cemetery.
William Rice Pryor (b. c.1860 – 1900); became a physician and surgeon in New York and died young. He was buried in Princeton Cemetery.
Lucy Atkinson Pryor; married A. Page Brown, an architect. In 1889 they moved to San Francisco, California.
Francesca (Fanny) Theodora Bland Pryor (b. 31 December 1868), Petersburg, Virginia; married William de Leftwich Dodge, a painter. They lived in Paris, followed by New York City.

Civil War
When her husband was commissioned as an officer in the Confederate Army, Pryor traveled with his company and served as a nurse. Their children were likely cared for by his family, as they had been living in Petersburg.  After he resigned his commission to go with General Fitzhugh Lee's cavalry, she returned to Petersburg to keep their family together.

New York City
After the war, Roger Pryor moved to New York where he read the law and started a new law practice. Sara Rice Pryor and the children joined him, moving to Brooklyn Heights in 1868.  Her second memoir describes their struggling through ten years of poverty (although she always had a domestic servant, first a former slave from Virginia, who returned to the South, and then an Irish woman). Pryor sewed all the clothes for her children, found places for the younger girls at the Packer School, got a loan from a family friend with her husband's war silver as collateral, and helped her husband with his law studies.

The couple became prominent among a number of influential southerners in New York, who were known as "Confederate carpetbaggers."

Civic organizing
Pryor became active in the social life of New York City in the late nineteenth century.  While she and her family were struggling, Pryor and her friends also realized that other women and children needed help. Thousands of immigrants were arriving in New York. Together with other women in Brooklyn Heights, she raised money to found a home for women and children in need. Her petition to the state legislature gained the group $10,000 toward purchase of a building in Brooklyn for the home.  After collecting an additional $20,000 through their own fundraising, the women started the Home in the 1870s.

In her memoir, Pryor noted that, following the 1889 United States Centennial celebration in New York, there was greatly increased interest in historic items, buildings and collections. She helped found and develop the following organizations, at a time when fraternal, civic and lineage societies were forming quickly: 
Preservation of the Virginia Antiquities (since 2009 named Preservation Virginia), which came to own historic Jamestown among other properties; 
Mary Washington Memorial Association, which raised funds to commission a memorial for the gravesite of the first president's mother; 
Daughters of the American Revolution (DAR); and 
National Society of the Colonial Dames of America. 
She organized a chapter of the DAR in New York. Among her fundraising activities, Pryor wrote that she "managed a great ball at the White Sulphur Springs to help build a monument over Mary Washington's grave."  Such fundraising events were important to providing for the preservation of historic assets.

Literary career
Sara Rice Pryor also became a productive writer. She had kept journals for years and used them as a basis for her two memoirs published in the early twentieth century.  She joined other Southern women at the time who began to publish work reflecting their own experiences and "contributed to the public discourse about the war." Nearly a dozen memoirs by Southern women were published around the turn of the century. Pryor's status as the wife of a Confederate officer and politician gave her legitimacy.  The United Daughters of the Confederacy (UDC) encouraged southern women to write of their experiences and publish their work, which enlarged their cultural power. In her Reminiscences of Peace and War (1904), Pryor wrote about antebellum society, but she also defended the Confederacy, as did fellow writers Virginia Clay-Clopton and Louise Wigfall Wright. The UDC recommended the works of these three for serious study by other women.

Like her husband in his speeches Pryor promoted the idea that the recent war had nothing to do with slavery.  She suggested that the average Southern soldier fought to resist the invasion by the North.  After noting that most soldiers were not slaveholders, she wrote, "His quarrel was a sectional one and he fought for his section."

In addition, Pryor wrote two histories and several novels, all published by The Macmillan Company in the early 1900s. Perhaps because of her status in New York, she had continued success in getting her books published, at a time when southern women writers were having difficulty in achieving this. Her memoirs have been important sources for historians. In the late 20th century, writer John C. Waugh drew extensively from her works for his joint biography of the Pryors: Surviving the Confederacy: Rebellion, Ruin, and Recovery: Roger and Sara Pryor during the Civil War (2002), which was also a social history of their circle.

After her death, Sara Agnes Rice Pryor was buried at Princeton Cemetery, near her sons Theodorick and William. Her husband and their daughter Mary Blair (Pryor) Walker were also buried there after their deaths.

Pryor's prominence in the Washington political scene is documented in Capital Dames: The Civil War and the Women of Washington (2015), by Cokie Roberts. Pryor's influence on naming female descendants after her ancestor Mary Blair is documented in Mary Blair Destiny (2019), by 3xgreat-granddaughter, Erin L. Richman.

Works

The Mother of Washington and her Times, New York: Macmillan Company, 1903.
Reminiscences of Peace and War, Macmillan Company, 1905 (revised edition; first published by Grosset & Dunlap in 1904).
The Birth of the Nation: Jamestown, 1607, Macmillan Company, 1907.
My Day: Reminiscences of a Long Life, New York: Macmillan, 1909, carried at Documenting the American South, University of North Carolina
The Colonel's Story, New York: Macmillan, 1911, novel.

References

Further reading
Garraty, John A. and Mark C. Carnes, eds., American National Biography, New York: Oxford University Press, 1999.
"Justice Pryor Is 90 Years Old", New York Times, 20 July 1918 
Roberts, Cokie, "Capital Dames: The Civil War and the Women of Washington 1848-1868," Harper, 2015.
Waugh, John C. Surviving the Confederacy: Rebellion, Ruin, and Recovery: Roger and Sara Pryor during the Civil War (2002)

External links
 
 
 "Sara Agnes Rice Pryor", Find-a-Grave

People from Halifax County, Virginia
1830 births
1912 deaths
Writers from New York City
People of Virginia in the American Civil War
20th-century American women writers
Novelists from Virginia
Women in the American Civil War
Activists from New York City
20th-century American novelists
Novelists from New York (state)
People from Hanover, Virginia
Burials at Princeton Cemetery